Jovan Albanez (–d. ) or Ivan Albanez  (Serbian) ) was a military officer of Montenegrin Serb origin who led the first group of colonists from the Military Frontier of the Habsburg monarchy to the Russian Empire in the first half of the 18th century.

Early life
An ethnic Serb, born in the second half of the 17th century in Podgorica, his real name was Mojsije Mitanović. He was originally an Orthodox monk.

Russian service 
Owing to Rákóczi's War of Independence (1703–1711), the position of Serbian militiamen in the Military Frontier of the Habsburg monarchy was endangered. In 1704 the first Serbian attempts were made to offer their services to Imperial Russia in the latter's struggle against the Ottomans. Prior to the beginning of the Russo-Turkish War (1710–11) Russian Emperor Peter the Great invited Serbian militiamen and Serbs in general to join the Russian forces.

Albanez travelled to St. Petersburg with a Montenegrin delegation that was sent in 1711 together with vojvoda Slavuj Đaković, the third delegation sent to Russia by metropolitan Danilo. Albanez became a captain of a small Serb unit that took part in the Pruth River Campaign (1710–11), where he distinguished himself. He became known by the pseudonym Albanez. Russian captain Ivan Lukačević and colonel Mikhail Miloradovich (grandfather of Mikhail Miloradovich), both of Serb origin, were sent to Montenegro to deliver documents issued by emperor Peter the Great (and written by diplomat Sava Vladislavich, another Serb in Russian service) on 3 March 1711 that called the Balkan Orthodox to rise up against the Ottomans during the Pruth River Campaign. Miloradović and Lukačević arrived at Cetinje and delivered them to metropolitan Danilo, who had them read at a Montenegrin church assembly. This was the first Russian delegation to Montenegro. Danilo, Miloradović and Lukačević then organized military operations (such as the attack on Nikšić). These Serbs in Russian service provided the Russian state with valuable information on political and social matters and the status of Serbs in the Ottoman Empire (primarily those of Old Montenegro, Brda and Old Herzegovina).

Peter the Great eventually decided to expand this Serb unit and turn it into a separate Serbian regiment. In 1723 Peter the Great sent Albanez to the Pomorišje and Potisje regions of the Military Frontier of the Habsburg monarchy to recruit additional Serbian militiamen. The invitation letter carried by Albanez was signed by Peter the Great on 23 October 1723. Every military man who emigrated to Russia with his wife and children would be granted arable land, while those who emigrated with larger numbers of people were promised additional privileges. Albanez was quite successful with recruitment. On 5 May 1724, Albanez reported from the Habsburg Kingdom of Serbia that he had recruited ten officers, including one colonel. According to some sources, 459 Serbs emigrated to Russia in 1724, and 600 in 1725. A detailed list of the military unit commanded by Albanez was made in 1726. They formed a small military unit commanded by Albanez and referred to as the Serb Command. In 1727 Albanez was appointed the first commander of the newly established Serb Hussar Regiment.

See also
 Rajko Depreradović
 Jovan Šević
 Jovan Horvat
 Andrei Miloradovich
 Nikolay Depreradovich
 Ivan Adamovich
 Avram Ratkov
 Nikolay Bogdanov
 Ilya Duka
 Ivan Shevich
 Simeon Končarević
 Pavle Julinac
 Peter Tekeli
 Ivan Lukačević
 Simeon Piščević
 Semyon Zorich
 Georgi Emmanuel
 Mikhail Miloradovich
 Anto Gvozdenović

References

Sources

External links

Year of birth unknown
18th-century Serbian people
Serbian military leaders
Imperial Russian Army generals
Slavo-Serbia
People from the Russian Empire of Serbian descent
Russian people of Serbian descent
1732 deaths
Habsburg Serbs
Emigrants from the Ottoman Empire to the Russian Empire
18th-century people from the Russian Empire
Serbs of Montenegro